Csaba Fenyvesi (14 April 1943 – 3 November 2015) was a Hungarian fencer and Olympic champion in épée competition.

He won a gold medal in the individual épée event at the 1972 Summer Olympics in Munich. He participated on the Hungarian teams that won gold medals in team épée in 1968 and in 1972. Fenyvesi died following a short illness on November 3, 2015 at the age of 72.

References

1943 births
2015 deaths
Hungarian male épée fencers
Olympic fencers of Hungary
Fencers at the 1968 Summer Olympics
Fencers at the 1972 Summer Olympics
Fencers at the 1976 Summer Olympics
Olympic gold medalists for Hungary
Olympic medalists in fencing
Martial artists from Budapest
Medalists at the 1968 Summer Olympics
Medalists at the 1972 Summer Olympics
20th-century Hungarian people
21st-century Hungarian people